Bilateral relations between the Kingdom of Thailand and the United States of America date back to 1818. Thailand and the United States have long been close allies and diplomatic partners.

According to a 2012 Gallup public opinion poll, 60% of Thais approved of U.S. leadership under the Obama Administration, with 14% disapproving and 26% uncertain. As of 2013, there were 7314 international students of Thai origin studying in the United States, representing 0.9 percent of all foreigners pursuing higher education in America. According to a 2014 Global Opinion Poll, 73% of Thais have a favorable view of the U.S, compared to 15% unfavorable.

History

19th century
The first recorded contact between Thailand (then known as Siam) and the United States came in 1818, when an American ship captain visited the country, bearing a letter from U.S. President James Monroe. Chang and Eng Bunker immigrated in the early 1830s. In 1832, President Andrew Jackson sent his envoy Edmund Roberts in the U.S. sloop-of-war Peacock, to the courts of Cochin-China, Siam and Muscat. Roberts concluded a Treaty of Amity and Commerce on March 20, 1833, with the Chao Phraya Phra Klang representing King Phra Nang Klao; ratifications exchanged April 14, 1836; proclaimed June 24, 1837. Naval surgeon William Ruschenberger accompanied the return mission for exchange of ratifications. His account and that of Mr. Roberts were collected, edited and re-published as Two Yankee Diplomats In 1830s Siam.  The 150th anniversary of Roberts' mission was marked by in 1982 by issuance  of the first edition of The Eagle and the Elephant: Thai-American relations since 1833, followed by multiple re-issues including a 1987 royal celebration edition and a 1997 golden jubilee edition.  This was affirmed by former prime minister Samak Sundaravej, who in 2008, met George W. Bush on the "occasion of the celebration of 175th anniversary of Thai–American relations."

Thailand is thus the first Asian nation to have a formal diplomatic agreement with the United States; eleven years before the Great Qing and twenty-one years before Tokugawa Japan. In May  1856, Townsend Harris, a representative of President Franklin Pierce, negotiated a modified Treaty of Amity, Commerce, and Navigation with representatives of King Mongkut (later Rama IV) that granted Americans additional extraterritorial rights.  Stephen Mattoon, an American missionary who acted as Harris's translator, was appointed the first United States consul (representative) to Siam. (Rodgers and Hammerstein's play The King and I mentions in passing that the King plans to send war elephants to assist President Lincoln in his Great War. The actual letter sent by King Mongkut after receiving presents from the United States was addressed to the President when James Buchanan was in office, to offer elephants for breeding stock, not war; the offer was received by Lincoln, who courteously declined.)

On the occasion of the 150th anniversary of relations, it was revealed that  President Andrew Jackson had given the king (later known as Rama III) a gold sword with a design of an elephant and an eagle chased on a gold handle.  The king had also been presented a proof set of American coins, which included the "King of Siam" 1804 dollar struck in 1834. The set, minus a Jackson gold medal, was purchased for a record price of US$8.5 million by Steven L. Contursi, President of Rare Coin Wholesalers of Irvine, California on November 1, 2005. The set had been sold by Goldberg Coins & Collectibles of Beverly Hills, California, on behalf of an anonymous owner described as "a West Coast business executive," who purchased it for over US$4 million four years before.

Early 20th century
Following the death of General Advisor in Foreign Affairs Gustave Rolin-Jaequemyns in 1902, Phya Suriyanuwat, the Siamese Minister in Paris, was instructed to find a replacement. Phya Suriya was unable to find a suitable candidate in Europe, and notified Phya Akaraj Varathon, the Siamese Minister in Washington, that under the circumstances, he had decided to engage an American. In 1903, former US diplomat Edward Henry Strobel took a leave of absence from his position as the Bemis Professor of International Law at Harvard School of Law to represent the Kingdom of Siam in The Hague at the International Peace Court—which Rolin-Jaequemyns had been instrumental in founding. In 1906, Strobel moved to Bangkok to take the position of general advisor, where he died January 15, 1908. Among his successors were Jens Westengard, 1909–14, Wolcott Pitkin, 1915–17, Eldon James, and Francis B. Sayre—all but for Pitkin former Harvard law professors. "The Siamese government trusted the American Adviser in Foreign Affairs to act in the best interests of Siam. Authority and responsibility were delegated to him. He was permitted a considerable degree of freedom in his work. It was in his capacity as a lawyer, a jurist, an advocate, and a policy counselor that the American adviser contributed significantly to the successful conclusion of the treaty negotiations with the West. The first U.S. White House state dinner of the twentieth century, and just the second White House state dinner ever, occurred in April of 1931, while King Prajadhipok was visiting America in order to get eye surgery. " An agreement on relations between the two countries was signed in Washington D.C. on December 16, 1920.

World War II

During the 1940s, Japanese army men invaded Thailand and Malaya. Thailand resisted landings on its territory for about 5 to 8 hours; it then signed a ceasefire and a Treaty of Friendship with Japan, later declaring war on the UK and the USA. The Japanese then proceeded overland across the Thai–Malayan border to attack Malaya. At this time, the Japanese began bombing Singapore.

SEATO
In 1954 Thailand joined the Southeast Asia Treaty Organization (SEATO) to become an active ally of the United States in the Cold War in Asia. In 1962 came the Rusk-Thanat Agreement in which the U.S. promised to defend Thailand and fund its military.

Treaty of Amity (1966)

Since World War II, the United States and Thailand have developed close relations, as reflected in several bilateral treaties and by both countries' participation in UN multilateral activities and agreements. The principal bilateral arrangement is the 1966 Treaty of Amity and Economic Relations, which facilitates U.S. and Thai companies' economic access to one another's markets. Other important agreements address civil uses of atomic energy, sales of agricultural commodities, investment guarantees, and military and economic assistance.

Proposed FTA (2004–present)

In June 2004 the United States and Thailand initiated negotiations on a free trade agreement which, when concluded, will reduce and eliminate barriers to trade and investment between the two countries. These negotiations were placed on hold following the dissolution of the Thai parliament in February 2006 and the subsequent coup in September. The new military government issued compulsory licenses for several anti-HIV drugs, effectively ending the FTA negotiations. According to Thitinan Pongsudhirak, a political science professor at Chulalongkorn University, this has put bilateral relations on a "back burner".

2014 Thai coup d'état

On 22 May 2014, the Royal Thai Armed Forces, led by General Prayut Chan-o-cha, Commander of the Royal Thai Army (RTA), launched a coup d'état against the caretaker government of Thailand, following six months of political crisis. US Secretary of State John Kerry issued a statement condemning the coup, saying that he was "disappointed" by the army's decision and "this act will have negative implications for the U.S.–Thai relationship, especially for our relationship with the Thai military".

Security cooperation

The United States and Thailand are among the signatories of the 1954 Manila pact of the former Southeast Asia Treaty Organization (SEATO). Article IV(1) of this treaty provides that, in the event of armed attack in the treaty area (which includes Thailand), each member would "act to meet the common danger in accordance with its constitutional processes." Despite the dissolution of the SEATO in 1977, the Manila Pact remains in force and, together with the Thanat-Rusk communiqué of 1962, constitutes the basis of U.S. security commitments to Thailand. Thailand continues to be a key security ally in Asia, along with Australia, Japan, the Philippines, and South Korea. In December 2003, Thailand was designated a major non-NATO ally (MNNA).

Thailand has received U.S. military equipment, essential supplies, training, and assistance in the construction and improvement of facilities and installations for much of the period since 1950. Over recent decades, U.S. security assistance included military training programs carried out in the United States and elsewhere. A small U.S. military advisory group in Thailand oversaw the delivery of equipment to the Royal Thai Armed Forces and the training of Thai military personnel in its use and maintenance. Funding for the International Military Education and Training and the Foreign Military Financing programs, along with selected other programs totaling US$29 million, was suspended following the September 19, 2006 coup d'état in Thailand. As part of their mutual defense cooperation over the last decade, Thailand and the United States have developed a vigorous joint military exercise program, which engages all the services of each nation and averages 40 joint exercises per year.

Thailand's U-Tapao Royal Thai Navy Airfield is currently the "only facility in Southeast Asia capable of supporting large-scale logistical operations". Thailand has allowed the US to use U-Tapao to land and refuel after traveling across the Pacific Ocean on the way to US operations in Iraq and Afghanistan.

Economic relations

Foreign assistance
Economic assistance has been extended in various fields, including rural development, health, family planning, education, and science and technology. The formal U.S. Agency for International Development (USAID) program ended in 1995. However, there are a number of targeted assistance programs which continue in areas of mutually defined importance, including: health and HIV/AIDS programming; refugee assistance; and trafficking in persons. The U.S. Peace Corps in Thailand has approximately 100 volunteers, focused on primary education, with an integrated program involving teacher training, health education, and environmental education.

Trade
The United States is Thailand's third largest trading partner after Japan and China. In 2006 merchandise imports from Thailand totalled US$22.5 billion, and merchandise exports totalled US$8.2 billion. The U.S., Japan, Taiwan, Singapore, and the European Union are among Thailand's largest foreign investors. American investment, concentrated in the petroleum and chemicals, finance, consumer products, and automobile production sectors, is estimated at US$21 billion.

As of 2021, "Thailand remains on the US Trade Representative's (USTR) watch list (WL) as it attempts to suppress intellectual property (IP) violations and online piracy", according to Bangkok Post.

Current bilateral issues

Counter-narcotics

Thailand remains a trafficking route for narcotics from the Golden Triangle—the intersection of Burma, Laos, and Thailand—to both the domestic Thai and international markets. The large-scale production and shipment of opium and heroin shipments from Burma of previous years have largely been replaced by widespread smuggling of methamphetamine tablets (ya ba), although heroin seizures along the border continue to take place with some frequency. The United States and Thailand work closely together and with the United Nations on a broad range of programs to halt illicit drug trafficking and use and other criminal activity. The U.S. supports the International Law Enforcement Academy (ILEA) in Bangkok, which provides counter-narcotics and anti-crime capacity-building programs to law enforcement and judicial officials from a number of regional countries.

According to Barry McCaffrey, a US four-star general, "the excellent U.S.-Thai counter-narcotics relationship has been an enormous success and stimulus for greater regional cooperation".

War on terrorism

Thailand has been important to the US war on terrorism, "providing access to military facilities, sharing information on the movements of terrorist organizations and suspected terrorists, offering military engineering and medical personnel to support reconstruction efforts in Afghanistan". The most visible element of this cooperation was a joint operation between the CIA and Thai police which captured Riduan Isamuddin (better known by his nom de guerre, Hambali) in 2003.

According to Shawn Crispin, the Asia Times Southeast Asia editor, Thailand represents one of the U.S.'s "once strong, now strained bilateral alliances". Crispin surmises that the long history of bilateral cooperation and Thai fears of China's rise enabled Bush to have "his way with Thailand". The US war on terror combined with Thailand's southern Islamic insurgency has created tension, particularly with Thailand's People's Alliance for Democracy (PAD). The U.S. has pressured and enabled Thailand to crack down on the insurgency with more proactive military force.

In 2008, Thai courts refused to turn over Jamshid Ghassemi, an Iranian national accused of missile parts smuggling to the US, the "first-ever failed extradition" between Thailand and the US. US-Thai friction also increased when Thailand refused to quickly extradite Russian arms dealer Viktor Bout, according to Crispin, signalling that "Washington is slowly but surely losing influence over its long time strategic ally". Crispin viewed it as "no doubt significant" that Secretary of State Hillary Clinton chose to visit Indonesia, but not Thailand, on her first trip to Southeast Asia.

Rice subsidies

Since the 1980s, US farm subsidies for rice, along with copyright and patent issues, have constituted the "major problems in U.S.-Thai trade ties". The rice subsidy was one of the primary obstacles to the negotiation of a bilateral FTA. Approximately two-thirds of Thailand's population are rice farmers, and the U.S. subsidy "severely strains U.S.-Thai relations as Bangkok finds itself unable to explain the income lost to its 35 million rice farmers". USDA-funded research to produce variants of Jasmine rice capable of growing in the US are viewed as biopiracy by many Thai rice farmers. In 2005, Thai rice farmers gathered outside the US embassy to chant a "traditional ritual to bring misfortune to enemies". Farmer protests also occurred outside the US embassy during the 2001 WTO ministerial meeting in Doha.

Thai officials "sharply criticized" the Farm Security and Rural Investment Act of 2002, and retaliated by joining two WTO dispute resolution cases against the US: one against anti-dumping subsidy offsets, and the Shrimp-Turtle Case. According to Oxfam, the US spends US$1.3 billion on rice subsidies annually for a crop that costs US$1.8 billion to grow, allowing the US to become the second largest global rice exporter (after Thailand) and dump rice at 34 percent below the cost of production. Following the election of Obama and the 2008 global financial crisis, there are Thai fears of renewed US protectionism.

China's rise
According to Stratfor, "Bangkok's support could prove pivotal for the United States in the years to come, as it presses war against militant Islamic groups in the region and prepares for the expansion of Chinese power". According to Crispin, however, it is "clear that Thailand fails to share the US's threat perception of China's rapid regional rise", trying to maintain strong relations with both the United States and China.

In the words of one analyst, "Despite being both a bilateral and multilateral US treaty ally, as well as holding major non-NATO status, Thailand has hardly factored into Washington's regional strategy." Since the Thai military coup in 2014 China has become Thailand's leading trading partner and its second largest source of foreign investment. Thailand's military budget for FY2017 includes the purchase of at least one Chinese submarine and Chinese armoured vehicles. China's premier became the first foreign national ever to address Thailand's parliament. Joint naval and marine exercises have been added to Sino-Thai army drills begun under Prime Minister Thaksin.

Embassies

The U.S. maintains an embassy in Bangkok, one of the largest in the world, and a consulate in the northern city of Chiang Mai. Thailand maintains an embassy in Washington, D.C. and consulates in New York City, Chicago, and Los Angeles.

Principal U.S. Embassy Officers were, in 2020:
Ambassador – VACANT
Chargé d'Affaires – Michael Heath
Acting Deputy Chief of Mission - James Wayman
Acting Political Affairs Counselor – Adam West
Economic Affairs Counselor – Ed Sagurton
Public Affairs Counselor – Mitchell Moss
Consul General – Scott Cecil
Management Counselor – Kent Stiegler
Regional Security Officer — Noelle Licari
International Narcotics and Law Enforcement Affairs (INL) — Greg Shaw

Black site
The CIA reportedly operated a "black site" in Thailand where terrorist suspects were interrogated and tortured, prior to incarceration at Guantanamo Bay Detention Camp. It is referred to as a "black site" as its existence is not acknowledged by the US government. Every Thai government since 2002 has also denied its existence. The site has been variously referred to as "Detention Site Green" and "Cat's Eye". Its whereabouts has remained secret despite media efforts to uncover its location. Some experts believe it was at a US installation in Udon Thani Province. Some say it was at an air base southeast of Bangkok used by US forces as a refueling hub for flights to Afghanistan. Others point to a section of Bangkok's Don Mueang International Airport controlled by the Royal Thai Air Force. The site was reportedly closed down in December 2002.

References

Further reading
 Buszynski, Les. "Thailand and the Manila Pact" World Today 35#2 online
 Fineman, Daniel. A Special Relationship: The United States and Military Government in Thailand, 1947-1958 (U of Hawaii Press, 1997)
 Kislenko, Arne. "The Vietnam War, Thailand, and the United States" in Richard Jensen et al. eds. Trans-Pacific Relations: America, Europe, and Asia in the Twentieth Century(Praeger, 2003) pp 217–245.
 Kislenko, Arne. "Bamboo in the wind, United States foreign policy and Thailand during the Kennedy and Johnson administrations, 1961-1969" (PhD Diss. U Toronto, 2000.) online with long bibliography
 Matray, James I. ed. East Asia and the United States: An Encyclopedia of relations since 1784 (2 vol. Greenwood, 2002). excerpt v 2
 Muscat, Robert J. Thailand and the United States (Columbia UP, 1990).
Gunaratna, Rohan, Acharya, Arabinda, and Chua, Sabrina. 205. Conflict and Terrorism in Southern Thailand. Marshall Cavendish Academic.

External links
History of Thailand - U.S. relations
U.S. Embassy Bangkok

 
Bilateral relations of the United States
United States